Rodrigo Abelardo Pesántez Rodas (25 July 1937 – 2 April 2020) was an Ecuadorian writer and poet.

Personal life

Pesántez Rodas was born in Azogues. He died on 2 April 2020, in Guayaquil, after contracting COVID-19 during the COVID-19 pandemic in Ecuador.

Notable works

Visión y revisión de la literatura ecuatoriana (2006)
Panorama del ensayo en el Ecuador (2019)
De cuerpo entero: antología poética (2008)
Presencia de la mujer ecuatoriana en la poesía (1960)
Poesía de un tiempo (1974)

References

External links
 Interview with Pesántez Rodas 

1937 births
2020 deaths
Ecuadorian poets
Ecuadorian writers
Deaths from the COVID-19 pandemic in Ecuador